Kryuchkov (masculine) or Kryuchkova (feminine) is a Russian last name and may refer to the following people:
 Dmitri Kryuchkov (1887–1936?), Russian poet
 Fyodor Kryuchkov (1913–1944), Soviet soldier and Hero of the Soviet Union
 Gennadi Kryuchkov (1926–2007), Russian Baptist minister
 Maria Kryuchkova (b. 1988), Russian gymnast
 Nikolai Kryuchkov (1911–1994), Soviet actor
 Olga Kryuchkova (b. 1966), Russian writer
 Sergey Kryuchkov (1897–1969), Soviet philologist
 Svetlana Nikolaevna Kryuchkova (b. 1950), Soviet/Russian actress
 Vladimir Kryuchkov (1924–2007), KGB director
 Vladislav Kryuchkov (b. 1989), Russian footballer

See also
 Kryuchkovo
 Kryukov

Russian-language surnames